The Swiss Alpine Ski Championships are the national championships in alpine skiing, organised every year by the Swiss Ski Federation.

Results

Downhill

Super-G

Giant slalom

Slalom

Combined

References

External links
  

Alpine skiing competitions in Switzerland
Recurring sporting events established in 1934
National alpine skiing championships
Alpine